"Beachy Head" is a song by British indie pop band Veronica Falls. The song was first released in the UK by independent record label No Pain in Pop on 14 June 2010, as a single with the B-side "Staying Here". The US release on 21 September 2010 came exactly one year before the release of the band's first album, Veronica Falls.

Reception
Allmusic picked "Beachy Head" as one of the highlights of the album. Consequence of Sound found a connection between this song and the band's first single "Found Love in a Graveyard" and wrote: "On the deceptively upbeat "Found Love in a Graveyard", Veronica Falls tell the tale of falling for a ghost, and dips into surf-rock on the irresistible "Beachy Head", an ode of longing for a popular suicide locale." The referenced locale is Beachy Head in East Sussex, the highest seaside cliff in Great Britain. The site is notorious for its frequent employment in suicides.

Video
A music video directed by Phillipa Bloomfield was released in June 2010.

Track listing
 "Beachy Head" - 2:34
 "Staying Here" - 2:16

References

2010 singles
2010 songs